Azmina Dhrodia (born 1985) is a Canadian expert on gender, technology, and human rights. She has led on these issues at the World Wide Web Foundation. She has worked for Amnesty International and Block Party.

Life 
Dhrodia was born in Canada in 1985. Her first degree was in Political Science at the University of British Columbia. She went to London School of Economics for her master's degree.

She worked for Amnesty International from 2010 to 2018. In 2018 she was a Researcher on Technology and Human Rights at Amnesty.

She has written for HuffPost when she was able to quote other leading women including Laura Bates, Miski Noor, Nosheen Iqbal, Imani Gandy, Zoe Quinn, Jessica Valenti, Diane Abbott and Nicola Sturgeon. The piece was titled "What Women Want Twitter To Know About Online Abuse" and it encouraged readers to contact Twitter's Jack Dorsey who had just written that he wanted to "stand with women around the world to make their voices heard." She wrote "Toxic Twitter: Violence and Abuse Against Women Online" , a report that looks at not only on-line abuse based on gender but also on race and class.

In September 2019 she joined the board of the Open Rights Group.

She has worked for the World Wide Foundation starting in October 2020. In July 2021 she organised 200 notable women to support an open letter demanding action to end on-line abuse. She began working for dating app Bumble in October 2021 as their Safety Policy Lead and in December 2021 she was recognised in the  list of the BBC's 100 Women.

References 

1985 births
Living people
Canadian women non-fiction writers
BBC 100 Women
University of British Columbia alumni
Alumni of the London School of Economics
Amnesty International people